Neil Bell may refer to:

Neil Bell (actor) (born 1969), British actor
Neil Bell (politician) (born 1947), Northern Territory politician
Neil Bell, pseudonym of Stephen Southwold (1887–1964), British writer

See also
Neal Bell, American playwright